Flukea vockerothi is a species of hoverfly in the family Syrphidae.

Distribution
Chile.

References

Eristalinae
Insects described in 1966
Diptera of South America
Endemic fauna of Chile